Solberg is a surname of Norwegian origin (Sol meaning Sun and Berg meaning Mountain), and may refer to:
Asbjørn Solberg (1893–1977), Norwegian politician from Østfold; served three terms in the Storting
Dorvan Solberg (b. 1934), American politician from North Dakota; state representative since 1998
Eirik Lae Solberg (b. 1971), Norwegian politician from Buskerud; representative in the Storting and government minister
Erna Solberg (b. 1961), Norwegian politician; serving in the Storting since 1989; Prime Minister of Norway since October 2013.
Harald Solberg (b. 1976), Norwegian politician from Vestfold
Henning Solberg (b. 1973), Norwegian rally driver; brother of Petter Solberg
Hill-Marta Solberg (b. 1951), Norwegian politician from Nordland; government minister 1994–97
Konrad K. Solberg (1874–1954), American politician from Minnesota; legislator and lieutenant governor
Leif Solberg (1914–2016), Norwegian classical composer and organist
Magnar Solberg (b. 1937), Norwegian Olympic biathlete
Marita Solberg (b. 1976), Norwegian soprano
Monte Solberg (b. 1958), Canadian politician from Alberta; MP for Medicine Hat
Myron Solberg (1930–2001), American food scientist
Petter Solberg (b. 1974), Norwegian rally driver; brother of Henning Solberg
Thomas Solberg (b. 1970), Norwegian professional football player
Thorvald A. Solberg (1894–1964) United States admiral
Thorvald Solberg (1852–1949), first Register of Copyrights (1897–1930) in the United States Copyright Office

See also
 Solberg Lake
 Solberg, United States Virgin Islands